Preston, also known as Preston Bend, is an unincorporated community and census-designated place located on the Red River in Grayson County, Texas, United States. It grew in the 19th century at the intersection of several military and trade roads and was an important crossing on the Shawnee cattle trail. Preston lost prominence after the MK&T railroad bypassed the town to the east, leading to a decline in traveler and cattle drive traffic. Much of its former town site is submerged beneath the waters of Lake Texoma. Its population was 2,096 as of the 2010 census.

History

Early settlement
Before European settlement, the general area of Preston had been occupied by the Caddo people, with the Comanche and Kiowa farther to the west. One of the first American settlers in the area was John Hart, who cultivated land at the bend in the Red River possibly before 1826. He left the area just after 1830 after being attacked by Indians during a trapping expedition on the Washita River.

During the 1830s, the United States relocated the Five Civilized Tribes from the Southeastern United States to the Indian Territory, on the north side of the Red River. As the first official United States expedition to the area, the Dodge-Leavenworth Expedition explored the region in 1834. Above Preston on the Red River Leavenworth Camp, situated just west of the mouth of the Washita River, the area was a base for this expedition. George Catlin made some of his famous Indian paintings from this camp.

In the fall of 1838, John Hart returned to the Washita Bend area with two partners. They cleared and fenced  and built three cabins. In 1838, the partnership dissolved and Hart took sole possession of the land. He leased the land to a tenant.

Holland Coffee and the trading post
Holland Coffee and Silas Cheek Colville created Coffee, Colville, and Company to establish a trading post on the Red River. After establishing three trading posts upstream, they established one in the Washita Bend. They occupied the area of Washita Bend after John Hart's tenant was killed by Indians. Hart later sued Coffee for the land, but lost. In 1837, Holland Coffee had been elected to the Texas Legislature and negotiated a peace treaty between the Republic of Texas and the Waco, Tawakoni, Kichai, and Towash (Pawnee) peoples on September 2, 1838, at a Shawnee village near the mouth of the Washita River.

The town of Preston grew up around the trading post established by Coffee and Colville.

The Trading Post of Holland Coffee site received a historic marker in 1936.

Roads and trails
Preston developed at the junction between the Indian Territory's Texas Road, leading north to Missouri, and what became the Preston Road, leading south farther into Texas. Roughly following a much older trail used by Native Americans for centuries, in 1840–1841, Colonel William Gordon Cooke created the military road from Coffee's trading house on the Red River to Austin.

Fort Preston
The Republic of Texas commissioned Colonel Cooke to make a supply post in the area, known as Fort Preston after Captain William Gilwater Preston, a member of the military road expedition of 1840–1841. Some doubt remains  that the town was named after him, and the origin of the name of the town is obscure. In 1840, Cooke was in charge of a company of men there. Coffee and other settlers were thinking about leaving the area before Cooke arrived. The village around Fort Preston grew up to be known as Preston, Texas. Some of the buildings at Fort Preston were made of bricks made in the area.

Later, the United States Army operated a depot to supply the Fifth Infantry from here. The Army depot operated from 1851 to 1853. The Preston Supply Depot was under the command of Lt. Thomas C. English and later by Bvt. Maj. W. F. Wood. Albert Sidney Johnston and the Second Cavalry came through Preston in 1855.

Glen Eden
When Holland Coffee married Sophia Suttonfield Aughinbaugh in 1839, they resided at his trading post in a  square log stockade on the Red River. The stockade enclosed several huts and cabins. It was completed in 1845. Holland Coffee was killed on October 1, 1846. Sophia later married several more times, and Glen Eden became the most famous residence in the area.

The town
Preston developed in the area around Coffee's trading house and was a considerable town in 1845 when William H. Hunt completed its town plat survey. The municipal government was established in 1851 with Tom Jackson as the first mayor. Preston's Masonic lodge was established in 1852. A United States post office was established in 1856, and later a post office operated from 1880 to 1914. Preston had general stores and at least one blacksmith shop.

Cattle crossing
As the cattle business developed in Texas and cattle trails to processing facilities in Kansas became necessary, the Shawnee Trail developed through the Preston area.

The crossing had been an important wagon crossing before 1850, with over 1,000 wagons crossing there in a year.

Ferries
Log raft ferry service was available at the trading post in 1839.

Holland Coffee, George Butts, and Slone Love operated ferries in the area.

Rock Bluff Ferry operated near the mouth of the Washita River close to Preston. In the late 1830s, James Tyson operated the ferry at the rock bluff. His ferry was little more than a log raft. Later, two partners owned this ferry, Jim Shannon and Bud Randolph.

Around 1853, Ben Colbert opened up his ferry downstream to cash in on the California gold rush. Preston was located on one branch of the California Trail, where it crossed into Texas from the Indian Territory.

Thompson's home became the first post office and courthouse in the county.

Hopes for expansion
Supplying the military posts in the frontier area was difficult. One idea was to expand and supply the army depot at Preston by steamboat. This plan was abandoned in 1853 due to the difficulty of navigating the upper Red River because of the Great Raft logjam. Later, after the destruction of the Great Raft, steamboats on the Red River were finally able to navigate up the river to Preston.  Preston had a steamboat landing.

In 1847, the Texas Legislature ordered a road to be built from Preston to Sherman.

In 1853, Congress funded an exploration of the best route west of the Mississippi for a transcontinental railroad. In February 1854, an expedition of 75 men led by Capt. John Pope surveyed a route along the 32nd parallel north from New Mexico to Preston. Secretary of War Jefferson Davis favored this path, though it was tabled until after the Civil War. This route was afterwards abandoned.  After the Civil War, the First transcontinental railroad was surveyed and constructed farther to the north.

Decline
Although Preston developed as the largest community in the area for many years, several factors led to its decline. When new counties were created by the Texas Legislature, their county seats were located near the center of the counties. After the Texas Legislature created Grayson County from Fannin County, the county seat was designated near the center of the new county, at Sherman. As the county government developed, the focus of growth left Preston. The site of Sherman was situated east of the Preston Trail and caused travelers passing through the area from the north to the south to gravitate east of Preston.

Butterfield trail

The Butterfield Overland Mail stage route, between St. Louis and San Francisco, began operation in 1857. The line ran across the Indian Territory from Fort Smith, Arkansas, to the Red River at Colbert's Ferry, a few miles east of Preston. The stage line had decided to bypass Preston as the traditional crossing on the Red River. Colbert's Ferry became a more popular crossing over the Red River as Sherman and McKinney developed. In 1857, Sherman was very small, made up of only two or three small stores. Much of the brick and material came from older buildings at Preston. By 1871, 14 stage lines were operating through Sherman.

MK&T Railroad

After the Civil War, the peace treaty between the United States and the Five Civilized Tribes allowed for a railroad to be built north and south across the Indian Territory. This railroad, the Missouri, Kansas and Texas, crossed the Red River near Colbert's Ferry to the east of Preston in 1871. By this time Preston had begun to decline and was largely abandoned. As other cities along the railroad's route prospered, Preston became a rural community.

20th century
 
In the 20th century, Preston had a public school system, two churches, a cotton gin, and a cemetery. In the 1930s, the town had about 20 residents.

New Preston developed more centrally within the bend.

Lake Texoma

The United States Congress authorized Lake Texoma's construction by the Flood Control Act of 1938 approved June 28, 1938, (Public Law 75-791) for flood control and generation of hydroelectric power. The lake's area submerged the Preston townsite. The United States Army Corps of Engineers bought all the land in the area in the late 1930s for Lake Texoma.

After the filling of Lake Texoma, only the cemetery was left from Preston; which was on high ground overlooking the town. The cemetery was expanded with a new section when Lake Texoma was created. Some of the existing graves that were to be under the lake were moved to the new section of the cemetery.

Preston Point is the peninsula in Lake Texoma that was the high ground overlooking the town of Preston. An unincorporated community named Preston exists on this peninsula, consisting largely of campgrounds and recreational cabins.

Demographics

2020 census

As of the 2020 United States census, there were 2,101 people, 834 households, and 355 families residing in the CDP.

2000 census
The population of Preston was 325 in 2000.

Geography
Preston was located in Texas on its border with the Indian Territory (later the state of Oklahoma) in the Red River Valley on a river bend just downstream from the river's confluence with the Washita River. The area was also known as Washita Bend or Coffee Bend. This area is located a few miles east of the Cross Timbers on the upper Red River above the former Great Raft logjam. This bluff at Preston marked the ford of an old Indian trail on the Red River. This ford was later used as the Red River crossing point of the Shawnee Cattle Trail. Later, the bluff also marked the return route of Captain Randolph B. Marcy's expedition from Santa Fe to Fort Smith in 1849. The Oklahoma side of the river was a relatively flat, sand-covered plain and terraces sloping gently to the river.

The current Preston CDP occupies the entire Preston Peninsula, bordered to the west by the main body of Lake Texoma and to the east by the Little Mineral Arm of the lake. The peninsula ends to the north at Preston Point, and the CDP extends south to the base of the peninsula, at Meadow Lake Drive to the east and at Highport Road to the west. Texas State Highway 289 has its northern terminus in Preston and leads south  to Pottsboro.

References

Further reading
 Foreman, Grant.  Down the Texas Road: Historic Places Along Highway Number 69 Through Oklahoma University of Oklahoma Press, 1936, Pp. 46.
 Landrum, Grahm and Smith, Allen.  "Grayson County" (Fort Worth, 1960; 2d ed., Fort Worth: Historical Publishers, 1967).
 Lucas, Mattie D. and Hall, Mita H.  A History of Grayson County (Sherman, Texas, 1936).
 Marcy, R. B., The Prairie Traveler unknown date, publisher
 Middlebrooks, Audy J. and Glenna P. "Holland Coffee of Red River," Southwestern Historical Quarterly 69 (October 1965).
 Morrison, W.B.  Colbert Ferry on Red River, Chickasaw Nation, Indian Territory ''The Chronicles of Oklahoma 16:3 (September 1938)
 Tolman, Keith. "Tea Kettle on a Raft: A History of Navigation on the Upper Red River," The Chronicles of Oklahoma 81 (Winter 2003-2004)
 Encyclopedia of Oklahoma History and Culture - Shawnee Trail
 Encyclopedia of Oklahoma History and Culture - California Road

External links

 Preston at GhostTowns.com

Unincorporated communities in Grayson County, Texas
Unincorporated communities in Texas
Census-designated places in Grayson County, Texas
Census-designated places in Texas
Submerged settlements in the United States